The 2000 Arizona Wildcats football team represented the University of Arizona during the 2000 NCAA Division I-A football season. They were coached by Dick Tomey in his fourteenth and final season. The Wildcats would finish the year with a 5–6 record (3–5 against Pac-10 opponents). Tomey resigned after the season concluded, which meant that he would not return for a fifteenth season as coach in 2001.

After starting the season at 5–1 with a possible chance at a Rose Bowl, the team would lose their final five games due to offensive mistakes and a poor defense, which prevented them from reaching a bowl game and leading to Tomey’s resignation.

Before the season
After Arizona ended the 1999 season with a 6–6 record and no bowl appearance, many fans believed that the Wildcats didn't live up to expectations after a 12-win 1998 season. The Wildcats had entered 1999 with Rose Bowl and national title aspirations before losing the opener to Penn State and the rest of the season went down with it.

The team had to rebuild by entering the 2000 season by replacing several talented players on offense, as running back Trung Canidate, wide receiver Dennis Northcutt, and quarterback Keith Smith all graduated and/or went to the NFL, though quarterback Ortege Jenkins and receiver Bobby Wade returned and hoped to turn the Wildcats back to their winning ways.

In the summer, Arizona upgraded its uniforms. Though the uniforms were the same, the only difference was that the players’ names and numbers changed into a futuristic font, as 2000 was a turn of new hope for the program.

By the preseason, Arizona went unranked in the polls and Tomey was put on the hot seat, as the Wildcats needed to win to save his job after underachieving in 1999. Tomey believed that the team would recover and contend for a bowl.

Schedule

Roster

Game summaries

Ohio State
After defeating Utah on the road to start the season, the Wildcats hosted Ohio State in the home opener. After outplaying the Buckeyes in the first half to lead 17–10 at halftime, Arizona would struggle as Ohio State took control and shut out the Wildcats in the second half and Arizona’s record evened at 1-1. To date, this is Ohio State’s first and only trip to Tucson and it remains the most recent meeting between the two teams.

USC
Arizona visited the Coliseum to face 22nd-ranked USC. In the opening minute, the Wildcats struck first on a 75-yard pass from Jenkins to Wade. They would add another long score later in the quarter to break it open. Arizona’s defense would shut down the Trojans’ elite offense and blocked two extra points after USC scored its touchdowns, and earned a victory over USC for the second consecutive season.

Washington State
The Wildcats, now back in the rankings (22nd), hosted Washington State in their next game. They would battle the Cougars back and forth for most of the game as they would trade scores all night. With the game tied at 33 late in the fourth quarter, Arizona had a chance at the win, but would miss a field goal that hit the goal post and the game went to overtime. 

After both teams traded touchdowns in the first two overtime periods, the Wildcats scored in the third frame to regain the lead. However, they would fail on a two-point try, leaving Washington State with a chance to win with a touchdown and the two-point conversion. On the Cougars’ first play, the Wildcats would intercept a pass to end the game and gave Arizona a wild victory. The win put the Wildcats in first place in the Pac-10 and moved them a step closer for a potential chance at the Rose Bowl.

Oregon
After their wild win over Washington State, the Wildcats traveled to Oregon to take on the seventh-ranked Ducks in a place where Arizona had not won since 1986, and became a difficult test for them in the quest for their goal. Oregon seemed to have the upper hand early, leading 14-0 before halftime. The Wildcats got back in it in the second half with ten unanswered points and had a chance to take the lead and possibly win it late for the upset, but would come up short as the Ducks held on for the win.

UCLA
Arizona returned home to host UCLA. In the Bruins’ previous visit to Tucson (1998), they took down the Wildcats that kept Arizona out of the Rose Bowl/national title picture. Arizona would play tough and led late in the fourth quarter before UCLA drove down the field and scored with less than a minute remaining to grab the victory.  The Wildcats were also hurt by turnovers, as Jenkins would throw four interceptions that led to the loss.

Washington
Looking to get back to the win column, the Wildcats traveled to Seattle to play Washington in another tough road test, as the Huskies were ranked eighth and in the hunt for the conference title. Arizona would outplay Washington in the early part of the game, and led 22–10 in the third quarter on Wade’s punt return for a touchdown and an upset was within the Wildcats’ reach. However, the Huskies showed why they were contending for the Rose Bowl, as they would storm back by the fourth quarter with a 22–7 run and took the lead with a touchdown with over a minute to play. Arizona had a final chance to possibly tie it, but Washington would block a field goal attempt as time expired to give the Wildcats yet another devastating defeat and ended their Rose Bowl hopes for good. The Huskies’ win turned out to be revenge for their loss to Jenkins and the Wildcats in the teams’ previous game in Seattle in 1998 when Arizona won on Jenkins’ wild touchdown despite Washington winning in Tucson in 1999.

Oregon State
For homecoming weekend, as well as Veteran’s Day (November 11), the Wildcats hosted tenth-ranked Oregon State while continuing to look for a win after three consecutive heartbreaking losses. However, in another difficult test, Arizona would be no match for the Beavers, and only scored on three field goals for the whole game. Fans, angered by yet another loss, chanted for Tomey to be fired as the final minutes ran down. The defeat put the Wildcats in danger of missing a bowl game with a 5–5 record, and needed a win against their rivals in the finale to extend the season.

Arizona State

Arizona hosted rival Arizona State in the “Duel in the Desert”, needing a win to become bowl-eligible while a loss would end the season with speculation that Tomey would be out as coach.

The Sun Devils, who had announced that they would part ways with their coach, Bruce Snyder, after the season due to wins and losses, faced the Wildcats by not having to deal with Canidate and Northcutt anymore (as both were in the NFL) and also tried to end the year on a high note.

In the game, both teams would start slow. As it went on, ASU would outsmart Arizona with a trick play by having the kicker running for a touchdown after faking a field goal try. The play would shift momentum, as the Wildcats committed costly mistakes, including a fumble that was recovered for a touchdown by ASU, that would ultimately seal their fate. The loss would end the season with a five-game losing streak for the Wildcats.

After the game ended, Tomey resigned as coach, citing “public pressure” from the Tucson community due to the program’s inability to fulfill its goal to reach the Rose Bowl after several near-misses at it, which included the successful 1993 and 1998 seasons. Tomey finished with a record of 8–3–1 against ASU as coach.

Rankings

Awards and honors
Bobby Wade, WR, First-team All-Pac-10

Lance Briggs, LB, First-team All-Pac-10

Joe Tafoya, DL, First-team All-Pac-10

Michael Jolivette, DB, Second-team All-Pac-10

Peter Hansen, DL, Second-team All-Pac-10

Season notes
Arizona finished the season with a five-game losing streak after starting 5–1, with several fourth-quarter meltdowns during that span ultimately costing the Wildcats at least three victories and a potential larger bowl game.

Tomey avenged his 1994 loss to Utah in the Freedom Bowl by defeating the Utes in the season opener.

The Wildcats were originally going to play Penn State for their home opener, but due to fears that the Wildcats would never beat the Nittany Lions after their blowout loss to them in the previous year, they scheduled Ohio State instead. After the team lost to the Buckeyes, Arizona officials believed that the Wildcats lacked the superior talent that both Ohio State and Penn State had due to both being in the Big Ten. As a result, the Wildcats have not played either team since and it is unlikely that they will ever in the foreseeable future.

Arizona would not beat both Stanford and Washington State again until 2006 and would also not beat USC again until 2009, with all three wins occurring on the road.

After defeating Washington State in triple overtime, the Wildcats would not get another home win over the Cougars until 2007 and would also not win another Pac-10 home game again until 2003. In addition, Arizona would not win another game in October until 2005.

As this was his final season at Arizona, Oregon was the only Pac-10 school that Tomey never beat on the road, with Arizona’s last win being in 1986, the year before he was hired. The closest that Tomey was to ever beating the Ducks in Eugene happened in 1994, when he lost by a single point. Arizona would finally beat Oregon in the road in 2006.

The loss to Oregon State was the only game of the season in which the Wildcats failed to score a touchdown, as they only scored nine points on three field goals.

The loss to ASU spelled the end for Tomey as he resigned due to not being able to compete for the Rose Bowl, leading to public pressure from fans. Tomey won 95 games with the Wildcats which remains to most by an Arizona football coach, which is unlikely to be surpassed unless a dominant Arizona coach wins more in the future. If not for the late-season collapse, Tomey would have likely remained the coach for 2001 and would have surpassed 100 wins. 

This was the last season in which Arizona Stadium had the word “Wildcats” in one end zone. Since then, both end zones read “Arizona” on them.

After the season
Tomey’s resignation as coach stunned his players and the program as a whole. Players were in tears after hearing the news.

Offensive coordinator Dino Babers also resigned out of respect for Tomey and defensive coordinator Rich Ellerson was fired due to a poor defense, meaning that the Wildcats would have a new coaching staff for 2001. Both coordinators would later become future head coaches, as Ellerson formerly coached at Army and Babers currently in charge at Syracuse.

After a national search, Arizona hired former Illinois and Texas coach John Mackovic as Tomey’s successor. Mackovic had ties to Arizona, as he served as offensive coordinator under former coach Jim Young from 1973 to 1976. He would also bring back Larry Mac Duff as defensive coordinator, who served under Tomey from 1987 to 1996 and helped build the “Desert Swarm” defense.

The Mackovic era would become a disaster for the Wildcats as he would lose control of the program and became embroiled in controversy. The team declined in wins, and would lead to him being fired during the 2003 season. Also, it began an era of futility and decline for the football program, which would lead to fans becoming more interested in basketball (due to its success by winning) and losing support for football.

References

Arizona
Arizona Wildcats football seasons
Arizona Wildcats football